Pain Fidarreh (also Romanized as Pā’īn Fīdarreh; also known as Pā’īn Fedreh and Pā’īn Fūdarreh) is a village in Layl Rural District, in the Central District of Lahijan County, Gilan Province, Iran. At the 2006 census, its population was 90, in 34 families.

References 

Populated places in Lahijan County